Louis Antoine de Pardaillan (5 September 1664 – 2 November 1736) was a French nobleman, marquis of Antin, Gondrin and Montespan, and first Duke of Antin.

Biography

The legitimate son of Louis Henri de Pardaillan, marquis of Montespan, and Madame de Montespan, he was carefully raised by his father at the Château de Bonnefont in Gascony with his older sister Marie Christine. He came to court in 1683 then set out on a military career, with his father gaining him a commission as lieutenant. 

Thanks to his 1686 marriage, he was able to enter the circle of the Grand Dauphin. His wife, Julie Françoise de Crussol, was a grand daughter of Charles de Sainte Maure, Duke of Montausier and a great-grand daughter of the famous marquise de Rambouillet. 

He was also an ally of his half-brothers the Duke of Maine and the Count of Toulouse, legitimised bastard children of Madame de Montespan and Louis XIV. However, despite his best efforts, he was unable to win the king's favour and, after he made an error in maneuvering his troops at the battle of Ramillies, he was even dismissed from the army in 1707.

Yet, later in 1707, Madame de Montespan's death brought her son Louis Antoine the bequest of Château de Petit-Bourg at Évry-sur-Seine and, more importantly, royal favour when he was finally rewarded by being made governor of the Orléanais (1707) then head of the Bâtiments du Roi (1708). In the latter role he gained particular access to the king. 

In 1711, Louis XIV promoted the marquisate of Antin into a "duché-pairie", and in 1724 d'Antin became a knight of the Ordre du Saint-Esprit. 

An excellent organiser with a natural aptitude for command, he knew how to please and how to smooth out difficulties, enriching himself greatly from the Law system. As head of the Bâtiments, the duke of Antin supervised works on Versailles. A confidant to Louis XIV and his architectural projects (such as the Salon d'Hercule), he managed to complete them under Louis XV. 

Antin opened new marble mines in southern France, such as that at Beyrède, which supplied a marble that was named "brèche d'Antin" after him, which was the preferred marble of Louis XIV and used for several of Versailles' fireplaces, such as the monumental one in the Salon d'Hercule.

In 1692 he bought the château de Bellegarde at Bellegarde, which he rebuilt at the start of the 18th century. He also rebuilt the gardens at château de Petit-Bourg before 1715, then around 1720 commissioned a new château from Pierre Cailleteau (known as "Lassurance"), whose construction was completed after the duke's death by Jacques V Gabriel. His Paris hôtel was in what is now the Chaussée-d'Antin, giving that area its current name. Under the Régence the duke of Antin came into political responsibilities. With the Polysynody he became president of the Council of Matters (Conseil du dedans). 

After the suspension of the councils he remained on the Regency Council, in a purely honorific position which he left on 22 February 1722 at the same time as the other dukes and marshals. From 1722 onwards he retired more and more, that year renouncing his title of duke in favour of his grandson, and died in 1736 at his Paris Mansion in the Chaussée-d'Antin. His Paris mansion was later the hôtel de Richelieu, Paris seat of the Duke of Richelieu.

Issue

On 21 August 1686 he married Julie Françoise de Crussol, daughter of the Emmanuel de Crussol, Duke of Uzès and Marie Julie de Crussol, granddaughter of the Duke of Montausier. They had two children;

 Louis de Pardaillan (1689–1712), Marquis of Gondrin, whose first wife was Marie Victoire de Noailles and had issue.
 Pierre de Pardaillan (1692–1733), bishop-duke of Langres and member of the Académie française, never married.

Works 
 Mémoires, published by Just de Noailles, duc de Mouchy, Paris, Société des bibliophiles français, 1821
 Discours de ma vie et de mes pensées, 1822
 Le duc d'Antin et Louis XIV : rapports sur l'administration des bâtiments, annotés par le Roi, published with a preface by Jules Guiffrey, Paris, Académie des bibliophiles, 1869

Bibliography
  François Bluche, Dictionnaire du Grand Siècle, Paris, 1990, p. 91
  Sophie Jugie, Le duc d'Antin, directeur des Bâtiments du roi, Thèse de l'école des chartes, dactylographiée, 1986
  Sophie Jugie, "Grandeur et décadence d'une famille ducale au XVIIIe siècle : la fortune du duc d'Antin", Revue d’histoire moderne et contemporaine, XXXVII, 1990, pp. 452–477
  Sophie Jugie, "Le duc d'Antin ou le parfait courtisan" : réexamen d'une réputation", Bibliothèque de l'école des chartes, tome 149, 1991, pp. 349–404
  Victor Montmillion, Le duc d'Antin, étude historique, Paris, 1935

Ancestry

1664 births
1736 deaths
French nobility
French soldiers
French army commanders in the War of the Spanish Succession
Heads of the Bâtiments du Roi
Louis Antoine
Louis Antoine
Peers created by Louis XIV
Ancien Régime office-holders
18th-century French people
17th-century French people
People of the Regency of Philippe d'Orléans
People of the Ancien Régime
18th-century French politicians
French military personnel
Marquesses of Montespan